Henry John Spearman (1794 – ) was a British Whig politician.

Spearman became a Whig Member of Parliament for Durham at the 1847 general election, and held the seat until 1852 when he did not seek re-election.

References

External links
 

UK MPs 1847–1852
Whig (British political party) MPs for English constituencies
1794 births
1863 deaths
Members of the Parliament of the United Kingdom for City of Durham